Wolf Trap or wolf trap may refer to:

 Wolf trap, a trap used for hunting wolves in medieval Europe
 Wolf Trap (film), a 1957 Czech film
 Wolf Trap, Virginia, census-designated place in Fairfax County, Virginia, U.S.
 Wolf Trap Opera Company, an opera residency program
 Wolf Trap National Park for the Performing Arts, performing arts center near Vienna, Virginia, U.S.
 "Wolf Trap", a miniature laboratory developed by Wolf V. Vishniac to search for life on Mars
 Wolftrap angler (Thaumatichthyidae), a family of anglerfish
 Wolftrap Farm, a former historic home in Isle of Wight County, Virginia, U.S.
 Wolftrap Mountain, a mountain in Offaly, Ireland

See also
 Wolfsangel, a German heraldic charge inspired by historic wolf traps